The Honda CG125 or Honda CG is a commuter motorcycle made by Honda of Japan. It was in production from 1976 to 2008 in Japan and has been in production since 1992 in Pakistan. The CG was originally manufactured in Japan, but the source for the European market was eventually moved to Brazil in 1985, and to Pakistan and Turkey in 1992 for the W and M models. 
The CG125 is powered by a  four-stroke, overhead valve, single-cylinder engine that has changed little over the years.

History
The CG125 was developed from the CB125 for developing countries' markets. The two models were very similar, with many parts in common. The main difference was in the top ends: the CB had an overhead cam (OHC). One fault with many Honda OHC engines of that era (generally denoted CB), was that they had a tendency to wear the camshaft bearings if oil changes were skipped. The CG engine was developed specifically to address this problem (amongst others) as Honda realised that riders in developing countries performed little or no preventative maintenance. To make the bike more reliable with minimal servicing, the CG125 uses overhead valves (OHV) with pushrods, a washable foam air filter, and fully enclosed chain. The fully enclosed chain was dropped in 2004.

Production and availability

In Pakistan the original CG125 is still being produced by Atlas Honda Ltd. Except for a few cosmetic changes, the Pakistani version has remained exactly the same as the original 1980s Japanese CG125 over the past years. It is currently available at a MSRP of ₨ 168,500 Pakistani Rupees as of 2022, equipped with a 9.2-liter tank, a Euro 2-complied overhead valve engine with kick-start mechanism, and a 4-speed transmission. The decoration graphics are redesigned, as well as the seat and the layout of the instrument cluster, to give this long-lasting model a refreshed appearance. Another variant called CG125 SE launched in 2019, has a 5-speed transmission instead of the original 4-speed and electric start. It is one of the few motorcycles offered by Honda in Pakistan.
 
In China, numerous legal and illegal copies of the CG125, along with the imported original and licensed production variants, had been widely available in the market since the late 1980s. Despite being an outdated design, it had maintained high popularity and good sales figures for decades. Illegal copies of the CG125 had been exported globally due to the high demand in the developing countries, especially in Africa and the Middle East, at a starting price of as little as $700 US dollars, while their reputation is mixed and generally not as good as the original. Some of these clones came with updates and options that were never available in the original models, including front disc brakes, remote start and engines with a larger displacement of 175cc, 200cc or 250cc, and could be water-cooled. The classic CG125 design also spun off a variety of variants, including autorickshaws, sand bikes, and even half-tracked tricycles similar to the WWII German Sd.Kfz. 2 Kettenkrad.

The most recent version of the original CG125 without the European market restyling is still in production in China as of 2021 by the two joint-venture partners of Honda, Wuyang Honda as the WY125-19 and Sundiro Honda as the SDH125-7E, although both models were marketed simply as the CG125 CDi. Both versions are modernized with redesigned fuel-injected engines with electric start and 5-speed transmission, fulfilling the latest emission standard, China-IV, while maintaining the classic appearance from the 1980s. The China-IV standard is even stricter than the Euro 4, so in theory, these bikes could be imported to the European market. The Wuyang version retained the overhead valve engine while the Sundiro version switched to a more modern overhead camshaft design, thus could be differentiated by the appearance of their engines, but both versions kept the same displacement and produced similar power and torque.

The Wuyang version had a redesigned engine with a compression ratio of 9.2:1, producing 10 horsepowers (7.3kw) at 8,000rpm and 9.5 newton-meters of torque at 6,500rpm, with a fuel consumption of 1.8 liters per 100km and a maximum speed of 93km/h. The fuel tank remained the old design and had a capacity of 8.6 liters. The kick-start mechanism is completely replaced by electric start, and gear indicators were added to the instrument cluster. The front drum brakes were enlarged and luggage racks were included as standard equipment. It is sold at a domestic MSRP of ￥6,980 Chinese Yuan ($ US dollars) and is exported to other markets including Japan, with a retail price of ￥139,000 Japanese Yen ($ US dollars) as a parallel-imported vehicle from the importers.

In the UK, the CG125 was popular with learners due to licensing laws which allow a rider to operate a 125 cc motorbike with L plates by completing a Compulsory Basic Training (CBT) course.

In Brazil, due to emission laws from 2009, the engine has been redesigned with an overhead camshaft (bore and stroke also changed from 56.5mm x 49.5mm to 52.4mm x 57.8mm). Due to Euro 3 emission laws the Honda CG125 has been replaced by the fuel injected CBF125 in the UK and Europe since 2009. Other manufacturers made overhead valve clones of the CG125 engine with same piston bore and stroke (56.5mm x 49.5mm) to comply with Euro 3 emission laws and they are widely available (as of 2020).

The CG125 had also been produced in South Korea and Thailand in the past. The South Korean CG125s were produced by KIA motors as the KIA-Honda CG125.

Changes
Over its lifetime, the CG125 has received numerous enhancements and tweaks:
 The electrics were upgraded from 6 V to 12 V (1985 in UK).
 The point (contact breaker) ignition system was replaced by the capacitor discharge ignition (CDI) system (1989 in Japan) and a little later in other countries. By 1993 Honda was using only CDI ignition systems for all of its motorcycles.
 An electric start was added in 2001, originally alongside the original kick start and replacing it completely in 2004 (in the European Market).
2004 saw a number of further changes in the European market:
 The front drum brake was replaced by a disc brake.
 A new instrument cluster, including a fuel gauge for the first time, replaced the old square unit.
 The styling was modernised.
 The chain casing was dropped in favour of a simpler chain guard.

This last change is one of the very few changes that sacrificed functionality (longer chain life) in favour of aesthetics.

References

External links

 Honda CG125 History

CG125
Standard motorcycles
Motorcycles introduced in 1976